Koshisaurus is a monospecific genus of basal hadrosauroid from the Kitadani Formation in Japan. The discovery of the genus suggests that hadrosauroids had higher diversity along the eastern margin of Asia in the Early Cretaceous. "Koshi" means an old Japanese regional name including Fukui prefecture where fossils of the genus were discovered.

Description
 
Koshisaurus was unlike most hadrosauroids due to the fact that it possessed an antorbital fossa, as well as three subsidiary ridges on its maxillary teeth, similar to those of Equijubus. These ridges are also present on the also Asian  genera Xuwulong, Jinzhousaurus and Altirhinus; but all three lack antorbital fossae, placing them as more advanced than Koshisaurus.

See also

 Timeline of hadrosaur research

References

Hadrosaurs
Fossil taxa described in 2015
Early Cretaceous dinosaurs of Asia
Fossils of Japan
Monotypic prehistoric reptile genera
Ornithischian genera